St. Mary the Virgin is a Grade I listed parish church for Great Warley in the Brentwood borough of  Essex, England. It is noted for its unique Modern Style (British Art Nouveau style) interior, designed by Sir William Reynolds-Stephens.

Built in 1902 with money and land donated by the Heseltine family, and consecrated in 1904, the church is Grade I listed. The architect was Charles Harrison Townsend.

The churchyard contains a war grave of a Royal Army Ordnance Corps officer of World War II.

Gallery

References

Church website
Brentwood Borough Council page
Art & Architecture entry
external pictures.

Great Warley, St. Mary the Virgin
Art Nouveau architecture in England
Art Nouveau church buildings in the United Kingdom